is a Japanese action adventure shōnen manga by Osamu Tezuka that was published in 1954.

Plot

Characters
Eiji: One of two brothers caught in a range of conspiracies revolving around the underground city's construction.
Eizou: Eiji's brother who is also caught up in the events surrounding the underground city's construction.
Rock as "Kenbo":
Doctor Takano: The scientist leading the construction of the underground city.
Sumiko:
Demonobirth: A mysterious, masked man who appears in the small village for unknown reasons.

See also
List of Osamu Tezuka manga
Osamu Tezuka
Osamu Tezuka's Star System

References

External links
"Devil of the Earth" manga page at TezukaOsamu@World 
"Devil of the Earth" manga page at TezukaOsamu@World 

1954 manga
Action anime and manga
Adventure anime and manga
Akita Shoten manga
Kodansha manga
Osamu Tezuka manga
Science fiction anime and manga
Shōnen manga